The 2021–22 season is the 56th season in the existence of Antalyaspor and the club's 26th consecutive season in the top flight of Turkish football. In addition to the domestic league, Antalyaspor are participating in this season's editions of the Turkish Cup and the Turkish Super Cup.

Kits 
Antalyaspor's 2021–22 kits, manufactured by New Balance, released on 8 August 2021 and were up for sale on the same day.

Supplier: New Balance / Main sponsor: Bitexen / Sleeve sponsor: Corendon Airlines / Back sponsor: Anex Tour / Short sponsor: Liu Resorts / Socks sponsor: Bitexen

Players

First-team squad

Transfers

In

Out

Pre-season and friendlies

Pre-season

Mid-season

Competitions

Overview

Süper Lig

League table

Results summary

Results by round

Matches

Turkish Cup

Turkish Super Cup

Statistics

Goalscorers

References

Antalyaspor seasons
Antalyaspor